Alebastrovo is a rural locality (a village) in Sylvenskoye Rural Settlement, Permsky District, Perm Krai, Russia. The population was 25 as of 2010. There are 5 streets.

Geography 
Alebastrovo is located 128 km east of Perm (the district's administrative centre) by road. Denisovo is the nearest rural locality.

References 

Rural localities in Permsky District